Suzyn Waldman (born ) is an American sportscaster and former musical theater actress.  Since the 2005 season, she has been the color commentator for New York Yankees baseball, working with John Sterling on radio broadcasts, first for WCBS-AM and currently for WFAN in New York City.

Early life and career
Waldman was born in Newton, Massachusetts, the daughter of Jeanne and Philip Waldman. She loved baseball from childhood; she recalls going to a game with her grandfather when she was three and a half years old. She also has joked that she chose Simmons College because it was near Fenway Park. She graduated from Simmons with a degree in Economics.   Prior to her broadcasting career, Waldman worked for many years as an actress and singer in musical theater. Her most notable role was as Dulcinea in Man of La Mancha. Her rendition of "There Used To Be a Ballpark" appeared on historian David Pietrusza's 1995 WMHT-TV documentary Local Heroes: Baseball on Capital Region Diamonds. Also, she has performed the National Anthem at many Yankee home games (most recently before a 2020 Yankees home game on July 31) as well as the 1986 ALCS Championship game 7 at Fenway Park.

Broadcasting career
Waldman is considered a pioneer in the male-dominated field of sports broadcasting. In the mid-1990s, she was a play-by-play announcer for the Yankees' local TV broadcasts on WPIX, which made her the second woman to serve in that capacity on TV for a major league team, after Gayle Gardner in 1993. In 2005, she was hired to do color commentary for Yankees baseball on WCBS Radio, partnering with John Sterling. According to the Yankees, Waldman was major league baseball's first full-time female color commentator.

Waldman has worked in sports reporting for more than 30 years, as a former broadcaster for the YES Network as the reporter on the New York Yankees Pre-Game Show and the New York Yankees Post-Game Show and New York sports radio station WFAN. Her voice—on a live sports update—was the first heard on WFAN when it premiered on 1050 AM at 3:00 PM on July 1, 1987 (it moved to 660 AM a year later). At WFAN, she covered both the Yankees and the New York Knicks basketball teams and co-hosted the daily mid-day sports talk show.

Following the 2013 season, the Yankees moved their radio rights to WFAN, and announced that Waldman and John Sterling would return for their tenth year together in the booth. She signed a two-year contract extension in February 2016 that ran through the 2017 season.

On December 16, 2017, Waldman signed a contract through the 2018 season. She is currently under contract through the 2022 season.

From June 29–30, 2019, Waldman called the first MLB games played in Europe.

Her long association with the Yankees has earned her the nickname "Ma Pinstripe" from New York Daily News writer Bob Raissman.

George Bell incident
At the start of the 1987 Major League Baseball season, Toronto Blue Jays outfielder George Bell was not talking to the New York media, thinking they had cost him the Most Valuable Player award the year earlier. He broke his silence after a win at Yankee Stadium, and the regular beat writers hurriedly gathered around his locker. New on the beat (women had just recently been allowed access to the locker room), Waldman joined the group; Bell immediately started screaming at her in Spanish and English.

"There was a deathly silence. I think the other writers were shocked, but I also think they still resented me more than a bit, and they certainly didn't want to lose this interview," she recalled on a radio show. "At the time, I was a little less tough than I am now. Tears welled up in my eyes and I said I better get out of there."

As she rushed to leave, Bell's teammate Jesse Barfield called out to her: "Suzyn, I went three for four today. Don’t you want to ask me any questions?" Waldman and Barfield, now a baseball announcer himself, became friends and have remained close since then.

Yogi BerraGeorge Steinbrenner feud
In 1985, Yankees owner George Steinbrenner sent his general manager, Clyde King, to fire manager Yogi Berra. This greatly angered Berra because in his previous firings, the team owner had personally delivered the news. Yogi vowed not to visit Yankee Stadium and not to participate in any Yankee function as long as George Steinbrenner was the owner of the Yankees. In 1999, Suzyn Waldman helped arrange a meeting between the two men that brought an end to the 14-year feud. Yogi returned on Opening Day of the 1999 season, a day also designated as "Joe DiMaggio Day."

Personal life
In 1996, Waldman was diagnosed with breast cancer. She sued Mount Sinai Hospital and two of its pathologists for misdiagnosing her as cancer-free, eventually winning over $2 million in damages from the case. While her chemotherapy regimen limited (and eventually ended) her day-to-day role of broadcasting Yankees games on TV, she continued in her role at WFAN throughout her illness. Her cancer has been in remission for several years.

Waldman is currently a resident of Croton-on-Hudson in Westchester County, New York.

Waldman received an honorary Doctor of Journalism from Simmons University in May 2021.

She was selected for induction into the Radio Hall of Fame on July 25, 2022.

References

Further reading

Articles
 Waldman, Suzyn (March 24, 1985) "Lady at the Bat: Suzyn Waldman Swings Into Her Fantasy at Fantasy Camp". New York Daily News.
 Raissman, Bob (March 22, 1996). "No Quit in FAN's Waldman". New York Daily News.
 Jeng, Christina (20 November 2005). "Suffern benefit hits home run". The Journal News.
 Kramer, Peter D. (November 30, 2006). "And singing cleanup ... Suzyn Waldman". The Journal News. pp. 35 and 36.
 Albanese, Laura (April 2, 2019). "It's been a difficult road filled with roadblocks for pioneering Yankees broadcaster Suzyn Waldman". The La Crosse Tribune.

Books
 Jones, Charlie; Doren, Kim (2003). Heaven Can Wait: Surviving Cancer. Santa Ana, CA: Seven Locks Press. . pp. 115, 116 and 117. 
 Grodin, Charles (2007). If I Only Knew Then: Learning From Our Mistakes. New York: Springboard Press. . pp. 36-37

External links
 New York Yankees biography
 Suzyn's reaction to the Roger Clemens signing
 

Major League Baseball broadcasters
American musical theatre actresses
National Basketball Association broadcasters
New York Yankees announcers
Actors from Newton, Massachusetts
American radio sports announcers
American television sports announcers
Living people
Women sports announcers
YES Network
Simmons University alumni
New York Knicks announcers
New York Giants announcers
People from Croton-on-Hudson, New York
21st-century American women
Year of birth missing (living people)